City Place is a mixed-use tower skyscraper in downtown Oklahoma City, in the U.S. state of Oklahoma.  At 440 ft (134m), it is the 4th tallest building in the city and has 33 floors.  Finished in 1931, it was Oklahoma City's tallest building for a short time before it lost the title to First National Center in the same year. In 2010, the top seven floors were converted into six condos; the penthouse condo occupies the top two floors.

It is currently the 8th tallest building in Oklahoma.

History
Constructed as the Ramsey Tower in 1931 by oilman W.R. Ramsey, City Place was involved in the "Great Race" with the First National Tower to become the first to top out, a race that Ramsey won.  The building was constructed in nine months by the Starrett Corporation, known for the construction of the Empire State Building. Ramsey's fortunes were short-lived, victim of the Great Depression, and the building was soon leased to the Anderson-Prichard Company (APCO) and the APCO Tower Corporation was formed where  J. Steve Anderson served as President. The building was later leased to Liberty National Bank, who remained its primary tenant until completion of the Liberty Tower in 1971. During Liberty's tenure, a skybridge was constructed at the 16th floor, connecting it to the Dowell Center.  The bridge was, at the time, the highest such structure in the world.  After Liberty Bank moved out, City National Bank moved in and constructed what was once the building's most distinctive feature, a rooftop marquee, which was removed when the building was renovated in the 1980s.  Another unique feature of City Place is the original fire escape, which is still in use. It consists of a spiral slide traveling the full height of the building. This was supplemented by a traditional staircase during Liberty Bank's tenure. Previous names of the building are: Ramsey Tower, APCO Tower, Liberty Bank Tower, City National Tower, Sonic Plaza, and First City Place.

Architecture
Although it was constructed in the Art Deco style in 1931, the building was renovated in the 1980s, modifying its architectural style by giving it a massive rooftop marquee, now removed.

The building was designed by Walter W. Ahlschlager and Claire Drury.

Notable tenants
Newmark Grubb Levy Strange Beffort, a real estate firm with ties to Cantor Fitzgerald and BGC Partners.

Anderson Prichard Oil Corporation

Oklahoma Commissioners of the Land Office

Oklahoma Department of Securities

UMB Financial Corporation, based in Kansas City, Missouri, has offices in the building.

See also
List of tallest buildings in Oklahoma City
List of tallest buildings in Oklahoma

References

External links
City Place Official Website

Art Deco architecture in Oklahoma
Art Deco skyscrapers
Office buildings completed in 1931
Skyscraper office buildings in Oklahoma City
Residential skyscrapers in Oklahoma City
1931 establishments in Oklahoma